Väinö Jalmar Heusala (16 May 1914 – 17 May 1982) was a Finnish sports shooter. He competed in the 25 m pistol event at the 1948 Summer Olympics.

References

External links
 

1914 births
1982 deaths
Finnish male sport shooters
Olympic shooters of Finland
Shooters at the 1948 Summer Olympics
People from Kalajoki
Sportspeople from North Ostrobothnia